name   = PGG|
  
  type   = National holding|
  
  foundation     = 2016|
  location       = Katowice, Poland|
  key_people     = CEO|
  num_employees  = 63,800 (2007)|
  industry       = Mining|
  products       = coal|
  revenue        = US$ 3.4 billion (2007)|
  

 Polska Grupa Górnicza  is the largest coal mining company in Poland and Europe producing around 48 million tonnes of coal every year, from 23 mines.

External links
Official site

Coal companies of Poland